Devolver Bootleg is a demake of a compilation of video games developed by studio Doinksoft and published by Devolver Digital. It was announced during Devolver Digital's press conference at E3 2019 and released on 10 June 2019. The compilation includes eight titles, which are parodies of video games published by Devolver Digital: Enter The Gun Dungeon (Enter the Gungeon), Hotline Milwaukee (Hotline Miami), Ape Out Jr. (Ape Out), Shootyboots (Downwell), Super Absolver Mini: Turbo Fighting Championship (Absolver), Catsylvania (Gato Roboto), PikuBiku Ball Stars (Pikuniku), and Luftrousers (Luftrausers).

Reception 
Devolver Bootleg has garnered a 69 out of a 100, with "mixed or average reviews", on Metacritic.

References 

2019 video games
Action video games
Devolver Digital games
Parody video games
Video game compilations
Video game demakes
Video games about cats
Video games about primates
Video games developed in the United States
Video games set in Wisconsin
Windows games
Windows-only games